Main Quarry or Castle Hill Quarry is a  geological Site of Special Scientific Interest in Mountsorrel in Leicestershire. It is a Geological Conservation Review site.

According to Natural England, this site "is probably the most dramatic and well-developed occurrence of asphaltite in Britain upon which international research into the origin of life on Earth has been carried out."

The site is private land with no public access.

References

Sites of Special Scientific Interest in Leicestershire
Geological Conservation Review sites